The Boxer is a 1997  Irish sports drama film written and directed by Jim Sheridan and co-written by Terry George. Starring Daniel Day-Lewis, Emily Watson, and Brian Cox, the film centers on the life of a boxer and former Provisional IRA volunteer Danny Flynn, played by Day-Lewis, who is trying to "go straight" after his release from prison. The film is the third collaboration between Sheridan and Day-Lewis, and portrays the increase of splinter groups within the IRA. In preparation for the role, Daniel Day-Lewis trained as a boxer in Ireland for a year.

Plot
Former Irish pugilist and Provisional IRA member Danny Flynn (Daniel Day-Lewis) returns home to Belfast from a 14-year stint in prison at the age of 32. Weary of the unbroken cycle of violence in Northern Ireland, he attempts to settle down and live in peace. After meeting his drink-sodden old trainer Ike (Ken Stott), Danny starts up a non-sectarian boxing club for boys in an old gymnasium.

While fixing up the old building, however, he runs across a cache of Semtex hidden underneath the stage. He throws the cache into the river.

Danny's action infuriates Harry (Gerard McSorley), a bitter and ruthless IRA lieutenant. Danny reconnects with an old flame, Maggie (Emily Watson), now married to an imprisoned IRA man and required by IRA code to remain faithful to him. Their relationship dominates much of the film.

Harry sees Danny and Maggie's relationship as a way to undermine the authority of her father, Joe Hamill (Brian Cox), the grim but war-weary local IRA commander who is working for peace. Harry feuds with Danny, assassinating the kindly police officer who donates equipment to the boxing club. The murder causes a riot at one of Danny's boxing matches. During the riot, the gymnasium is burnt down by Liam, the young son of Maggie, who thinks Danny and his mother are going to elope.

Eventually, Harry and some other IRA men kidnap Danny and take him away to be executed. Then, in a last-minute twist, the IRA gunman shoots Harry instead of Danny, thus eliminating a rogue agent. With her son Liam in the car, Maggie picks up Danny and they all drive home together.

Cast

Release
The film opened in 3 theaters in the United States on 31 December 1997. It opened in Ireland on 6 February 1998.

Reception
Reviews of the film were generally positive; the review aggregating website Rotten Tomatoes reported that 80% of the 70 reviews tallied were positive with the consensus: "The Boxer is a standard drama that packs a true emotional wallop thanks to the highly tuned central performances."

Box office
The film grossed US$5,896,037 in the United States and Canada. In the UK and Ireland, the film grossed £1.3 million ($2.2 million). Elsewhere, the film grossed $8 million, for a worldwide total of $16 million.

Awards
The Boxer was nominated for three Golden Globe Awards in the Picture, Actor (Daniel Day-Lewis) and Director (Jim Sheridan) categories. It also competed for the Golden Bear at 48th Berlin International Film Festival in 1998.

References

External links
 
 

1997 films
1990s sports drama films
Northern Irish films
Irish sports drama films
English-language Irish films
Irish boxing films
Films about The Troubles (Northern Ireland)
Films about the Irish Republican Army
Films directed by Jim Sheridan
Films set in Belfast
Universal Pictures films
1997 drama films
1990s English-language films